Washington Peak can refer to the following mountains in the United States:

Washington Peak (Alaska)
Washington Peak (California) in Del Norte County
Washington Peak (Idaho) in Custer County
Washington Peak (Washington) in Chelan County

See also
 Mount Washington (disambiguation)

References